Amaia Malatsetxebarria Ibaibarriaga (born 9 December 2000) is a Spanish professional racing cyclist, who most recently rode for UCI Women's Continental Team .

References

External links
 

2000 births
Living people
Spanish female cyclists
People from Lea-Artibai
Sportspeople from Biscay
Cyclists from the Basque Country (autonomous community)